The Committee for a Democratic Far Eastern Policy (CDFEP) was an organization that was active in 1945–52 in opposing US support for the Kuomintang government in China.

History

The CDFEP was founded in August 1945, towards the end of World War II (1939–45).
It was Left-leaning, liberal and progressive.
The committee was opposed to the policy of Harry S. Truman's administration to support Chiang Kai-shek and his Kuomintang government in China.
Founders included Frederick Vanderbilt Field and Philip J. Jaffe, who both had connections with the Communist Party USA (CPUSA).
The retired brigadier general Evans Carlson publicly supported the committee, and progressive China hands such as Edgar Snow were active in it.
Agnes Smedley was not at first invited to join, perhaps because of her disagreements with the CPUSA.
The Christian leader and YWCA executive Rose Terlin became a supporter of the committee, as did the American YWCA Secretaries Talitha Gerlach and Lily Haass, who had both worked in China.
From 1946 the organization was headed by Maud Russell as executive director.

The committee was mainly based in California and the west coast of the US.
The CDFEP offices were in the same New York building as the Institute of Pacific Relations (IPR) and the left-wing journal Amerasia.
The organization was loosely structured, and at its peak of activity in 1946 had only six paid employees.
The committee members spoke and wrote on Chinese current affairs, and published the newsletter Far East Spotlight.
The CDFEP rarely paid its speakers or the political writers who contributed to its publications.
In the winter of 1947–48 Agnes Smedley addressed the CDFEP, which now honored her as "the Matriarch of Far Eastern Writers".
After the Communists took power in China in 1949, the committee favored diplomatic recognition of the People's Republic of China.
The committee members were opposed to the US policy in the Korean War.
After Anna Louise Strong fell out with the Soviet Communist Party in 1949 over her support of Mao Zedong's nationalist movement, the CDEFP led the fight against her rehabilitation, perhaps due to CPUSA pressure.

Dissolution and legacy

In the early 1950s the House Un-American Activities Committee and the Attorney General's Subversive Activities Control Board monitored the CDFEP closely.
Funding dried up, members resigned, and in August 1952 the committee was dissolved.
In November 1952 Russell wrote to the last CDFEP members,

Russell launched a newsletter Far East Reporter as a successor to Far East Spotlight.
In the early 1970s, with relations between the US and China improving, some of former members of the CDFEP came into demand as speakers on China-related topics.
Some of former members, including Russell, founded the US–China Peoples Friendship Association.

Notes

Sources

1945 establishments in the United States
1952 disestablishments in the United States
Political organizations based in the United States
China–United States relations